The Emigrant (French: L'émigrante) is a 1940 French comedy film directed by Léo Joannon and starring Edwige Feuillère, Jean Chevrier and Georges Lannes.

The film's sets were designed by the art director Robert-Jules Garnier.

Cast
 Edwige Feuillère as Christiane Vallier  
 Jean Chevrier as François Champart  
 Georges Lannes as Tino 
 Foun-Sen as L'Annamite aux béquilles 
 Palmyre Levasseur as La religieuse de l'hospice de Lisbonne 
 Jacques Vitry as Le commissaire  
 Edmond Van Daële as Un émigrant 
 Philippe Richard as Le médecin-chef  
 Serge Nadaud as Un officier 
 Marcel Pérès as Gaston - un émigrant 
 Marcel Duhamel
 Duluard 
 Robert Brunet 
 Paul Lluís
 Génia Vaury as Madame Vermeersch  
 Hélène Dassonville as Eliane 
 Gaston Jacquet as Un officier  
 Roger Capellani as Un émigrant  
 Emile Saulieu
 Jean d'Yd as L'ingénieur-chef  
 Åke Engfeldt as L'émigrant suédois  
 Pierre Juvenet as Le représentant de la compagnie  
 René Charles 
 Maurice Marceau
 Roger Bontemps as Vermeersch  
 Pierre Larquey as Monrozat  
 Raymond Aimos as Un employé du bateau 
 Charles Bouillaud
 Bernard La Jarrige as Le journaliste  
 Frédéric Mariotti as Un émigrant  
 Robert Ozanne as L'ami de Tino 
 Forde Willis as L'architecte

References

Bibliography 
 Monaco, James. The Encyclopedia of Film. Perigee Books, 1991.

External links 
 

1940 films
French comedy films
1940 comedy films
1940s French-language films
Films directed by Léo Joannon
Films scored by Michel Michelet
Films with screenplays by Jean Aurenche
French black-and-white films
1940s French films